Following is a list of Iranian senators (in alphabetical order by last name) who are notable for their work.

 Ali Dashti
 Mahmoud Hessabi
 Mohsen Sadr
 Jafar Sharif-Emami
 Hassan Taqizadeh

References 
Eurobuch website, visiter 2017
Tarikh Irani website, visited 2017
website of the Institute of Contemporary History of Iran Studies, visited 2017

Senators
Lists of political office-holders in Iran